Reginald Tindal Kennedy Bosanquet (9 August 1932 – 27 May 1984) was a British journalist and broadcaster who was an anchor of News at Ten for ITN from 1967 to 1979.

Early life
Bosanquet, of Huguenot descent, was the only child of the England cricketer Bernard Bosanquet (credited with inventing the googly). His great-great-grandfather was Sir Nicolas Conyngham Tindal, Lord Chief Justice (1829–1843), through whom Bosanquet was senior lineal representative of the ancient Scales barony, although he never sought to establish his claim to the title and a seat in the House of Lords.

Education
Bosanquet was educated at several independent boarding schools: at Ashbury College in Rockcliffe Park in the city of Ottawa; Wellesley House School, in the seaside town of Broadstairs in Kent; and Winchester College, before going up to New College at the University of Oxford, where he read history.

Television
Bosanquet was on the staff of ITN from its earliest days, initially as a sub-editor. He later reported from many parts of the world and was diplomatic correspondent for four years, before becoming one of its lead anchors during the late 1960s and 1970s, often working alongside Andrew Gardner, Leonard Parkin, Sandy Gall and, mostly late in his tenure, Alastair Burnet.

His partnership with Anna Ford on News at Ten was popular with viewers in the late 1970s. As Ford has since revealed, this rapport could prove distressing: on one occasion Bosanquet, having somehow discovered the birth-date of Ford's mother, wished her a "happy birthday" at the end of the broadcast, unaware that she had died some time previously. Ford recalled in 2007: "Reggie was a dear. I mean, you wouldn't have chosen a man who had epilepsy, was an alcoholic, had had a stroke and wore a toupée to read the news, but the combination was absolute magic."

Although held in considerable affection by the public (he was commonly addressed by family, friends and the media as "Reggie"), Bosanquet was not without his critics as a newsreader. At times he could appear puzzled by unfamiliar foreign names while his trademark slurred delivery fed contemporary suspicions that he was a heavy drinker. Such rumours became raw material for wags and comedy writers: Bosanquet acquired such nicknames as "Reginald Beaujolais", "Reginald Boozalot" and "Reginald Boozatten".

Later career
Bosanquet was elected rector of the University of Glasgow in 1980, serving until 1984. He was a controversial choice: shortly after his election he hit the headlines when he turned up at an official reception late and drunk, and insulted various guests, including the Lord Provost of Glasgow (and his eventual successor as rector) Michael Kelly.

In 1980, Bosanquet "sang" (or, more accurately, narrated in the style of a newscast) the lyrics on the disco single "Dance with Me". It was voted no. 1 in the Bottom 30 by listeners of British DJ Kenny Everett.

Personal life
Bosanquet married three times and had two daughters, Abigail and Delilah. He died from pancreatic cancer on 27 May 1984, aged 51 and is buried at Putney Vale Cemetery. Bosanquet's death was overshadowed by that of comedian Eric Morecambe, who died the following morning, aged 58.

In popular culture
Bosanquet was mentioned in the "Rat-catcher" sketch in the Monty Python's Flying Circus episode of "The Attila The Hun Show" in 1970, and did actually appear in the "Royal Episode 13" episode that same season.

Bosanquet is portrayed by Matthew Cottle in the 2022 miniseries Pistol. He is first seen buying bondage underwear from Vivienne Westwood and Malcolm McLaren’s shop Sex and subsequently appears in his role as a newsreader.  A parody song was sung by Pamela Stephenson on the show Not the Nine O'Clock News referencing him leaving his news reading role.

See also
 Baron Scales
 John Le Carre's autobiography
 Tyndall family

References

1932 births
1984 deaths
Alumni of New College, Oxford
Burials at Putney Vale Cemetery
Deaths from cancer in England
Deaths from pancreatic cancer
British male journalists
ITN newsreaders and journalists
People educated at Winchester College
People with epilepsy
Rectors of the University of Glasgow
Bosanquet family